Private Worlds is a 1971 novel by the British writer Sarah Gainham. It was the third in her Vienna trilogy following the popular first novel Night Falls on the City.

Synopsis
Now that the immediate post-war crisis of Vienna has finished, Julia Homburg and her old friend and lover, the journalist Georg Kerenyi, are able to reconstruct their former lives at the same time as a new, independent and democratic Austrian Republic is being formed.

References

Bibliography
 Burton, Alan. Historical Dictionary of British Spy Fiction. Rowman & Littlefield, 2016.
 Husband, Janet G. & Husband Jonathan F. Sequels: An Annotated Guide to Novels in Series. American Library Association, 2009.
 Reilly, John M. Twentieth Century Crime & Mystery Writers. Springer, 2015.

1971 British novels
Novels by Sarah Gainham
Novels set in Vienna
Weidenfeld & Nicolson books